Turin railway station may refer to:

 Torino Lingotto railway station
 Torino Porta Nuova railway station, the main railway station in Turin, Italy
 Torino Porta Susa, the second busiest mainline station in the city

See also 
 List of railway stations in Turin